Fabián Nicolás Ramos Paz (born 12 August 1994) is an Argentine-born Chilean footballer who last played for Chilean Segunda División side Rodelindo Román as a midfielder .

Career
In his early life, he was in the youth teams of Universidad de Chile, Unión Española and Cobreloa. Later, he played for several amateur clubs at the Tercera A and at the Tercera B, the fourth and the fifth level of the Chilean football respectively, getting the 2019 Tercera B Championship along with Rodelindo Román.

On 2020 season he signed with Chilean Primera División side Deportes Iquique. The next season, he returned to Rodelindo Román, which was recently promoted to Chilean Segunda División.

Personal life
On 2019, Ramos made appearances in a docu-reality series about the football club Rodelindo Román called "Rodelindo Román: Del barrio al mundo" (Rodelindo Román: From neighborhood to the world) broadcast by both CDF and Chilevisión, where he was nicknamed El Especialista (The Specialist).

Honours
Rodelindo Román
 Tercera B: 2019

References

External links

Fabián Ramos at playmakerstats.com (English version of ceroacero.es)

1994 births
Living people
Footballers from Santa Fe, Argentina
Argentine sportspeople of Chilean descent
Argentine emigrants to Chile
Naturalized citizens of Chile
Chilean footballers
Citizens of Chile through descent
Deportes Recoleta footballers
Rodelindo Román footballers
Deportes Iquique footballers
Segunda División Profesional de Chile players
Chilean Primera División players
Association football midfielders